Seonsan, or Seonsan-eup, is an eup or large village in Gumi City, Gyeongsangbuk-do, South Korea.  It has a population of around 20,000 people, and an area of 69 km².  There are several historical landmarks in Seonsan, including two Joseon Dynasty schools:  Geumo Seowon and the Seonsan hyanggyo.  In addition, South Korean national treasure number 130, the five-storied pagoda of Jukjang-dong, is located there.

History
Seonsan was the site of the final battle between Goryeo and Hubaekje in 936, in which Hubaekje was finally defeated by the combined forces of Wang Geon and Gyeon Hwon.

Seonsan was raised from myeon to eup status in 1979.  Since 2004, it has been connected to the Jungbu Naeryuk Expressway. 

Famous people associated with Seonsan include former South Korean president Park Chung-hee and early Joseon Dynasty scholar Ha Wi-ji.

See also
Geography of South Korea
Subdivisions of South Korea

Gumi, North Gyeongsang
Towns and townships in North Gyeongsang Province